San Pelaio is a railway station in Zarautz, Basque Country, Spain. It is owned by Euskal Trenbide Sarea and operated by Euskotren. It lies on the Bilbao-San Sebastián line.

History 
The station was temporarily closed in June 2022, the closure will last for approximately one year. During that time it will be renovated, together with the neighboring Zarautz station.

Services 
The station is served by Euskotren Trena line E1. It runs every 30 minutes (in each direction) during weekdays, and every hour during weekends.

References

External links
 

Euskotren Trena stations
Railway stations in Gipuzkoa